Angela Herron (born May 25, 1961) is a retired American lightweight rower. She won a gold medal at the 1984 World Rowing Championships in Montreal, Canada, with the lightweight women's eight; this was the only year that this boat class competed at World Rowing Championships. At the 1986 World Rowing Championships in Nottingham, she won a bronze medal in the lightweight women's single scull. At the 1987 World Rowing Championships in Copenhagen, she became world champion in the lightweight women's four. At the 1991 World Rowing Championships in Vienna, she came fourth in the lightweight women's single scull.

She also competed in the women's quadruple sculls event at the 1988 Summer Olympics.

References

1961 births
Living people
American female rowers
World Rowing Championships medalists for the United States
Olympic rowers of the United States
Rowers at the 1988 Summer Olympics
21st-century American women